This is a list of candidates for the 2018 Victorian state election. The election was held on 24 November 2018. Nominations of candidates opened on 31 October 2018. Nominations for party candidates closed on 8 November, and for independent candidates on 9 November.

A total of 887 candidates nominated for the election, down from 896 at the 2014 election. There are 507 candidates for the Legislative Assembly, the second-highest number on record, down from 545 in 2014. The 380 candidates for the Legislative Council is the highest number of upper house candidates in a Victorian election, up from 351 in 2014.

Retiring Members

Labor 
 Judith Graley MLA (Narre Warren South) – announced 19 August 2017
 Geoff Howard MLA (Buninyong) – announced 15 September 2017
 Sharon Knight MLA (Wendouree) – announced 31 July 2017
 Telmo Languiller MLA (Tarneit) – announced 26 August 2017
 Hong Lim MLA (Clarinda) – announced 5 September 2017
 Wade Noonan MLA (Williamstown) – announced 4 October 2017
 Jude Perera MLA (Cranbourne) – announced 15 September 2017
 Marsha Thomson MLA (Footscray) – announced 21 September 2017
 Khalil Eideh MLC (Western Metropolitan Region) – announced 21 September 2017
 Daniel Mulino MLC (Eastern Victoria Region) – retiring to run for federal House of Representatives

Liberal 
 Louise Asher MLA (Brighton) – announced 11 August 2016
 Martin Dixon MLA (Nepean) – announced 10 August 2016
 Christine Fyffe MLA (Evelyn) – announced 21 October 2016
Murray Thompson MLA (Sandringham) – announced 24 November 2016
Richard Dalla-Riva MLC (Eastern Metropolitan Region) – announced 10 February 2017
Simon Ramsay MLC (Western Victoria Region) – announced 24 July 2018

Independent 
Don Nardella MLA (Melton) – announced 28 February 2017

Candidates for Legislative Assembly
Sitting members are shown in bold text. Successful candidates are highlighted in the relevant colour. Where there is possible confusion, an asterisk (*) is also used.

Candidates for Legislative Council
Sitting members are shown in bold text. Tickets that elected at least one MLC are highlighted in the relevant colour. Successful candidates are identified by an asterisk (*).

Eastern Metropolitan
The Labor Party were defending one seat. The Liberal Party were defending three seats. The Greens were defending one seat.

Eastern Victoria
The Labor Party were defending two seats. The Liberal/National Coalition were defending two seats. The Shooters, Fishers and Farmers Party were defending one seat.

Northern Metropolitan
The Labor Party were defending two seats. The Liberal Party were defending one seat. The Greens were defending one seat. The Sex Party, rebranded as the Reason Party, were defending one seat.

Northern Victoria
The Labor Party were defending two seats. The Liberal/National Coalition were defending two seats. The Shooters, Fishers and Farmers Party were defending one seat.

South Eastern Metropolitan
The Labor Party was defending two seats. The Liberal Party was defending two seats. The Greens were defending one seat.

Southern Metropolitan
The Labor Party was defending one seat. The Liberal Party was defending three seats. The Greens was defending one seat.

Western Metropolitan
The Labor Party was defending two seats. The Liberal Party was defending one seat. The Greens was defending one seat. The Democratic Labour Party was defending one seat, although MLC Rachel Carling-Jenkins, initially defecting  to the Australian Conservatives and then sitting as an independent, unsuccessfully contested the lower house seat of Werribee.

Western Victoria
The Labor Party were defending two seats. The Liberal/National Coalition were defending two seats. Vote 1 Local Jobs were defending one seat, although founder James Purcell unsuccessfully contested the lower house South-West Coast district.

References

External links
ABC Elections
Victorian Labor Party
Liberal Victoria
The Nationals - Meet the Team
Fiona Patten's Reason Party
Victorian Greens
Democratic Labour Party
Animal Justice Party
Tony Hooper - Vocal4Local
Sustainable Australia Party

Candidates for Victorian state elections
2018 Victorian state election